List of Road FC (Road Fighting Championship) champions is a list of fighters who have won Road FC championships.

Current champions

Men's championship history

Openweight championship 
no weight limit

Light Heavyweight championship 
~ 93 kg (205.3 lb)

Middleweight championship 
~ 84 kg (185.2 lb)

Lightweight championship 
~ 70 kg (154.3 lb)

Featherweight championship 
~ 66 kg (145.5 lb)

Bantamweight championship 
~ 61 kg (134.5 lb)

Flyweight championship 
~ 57 kg (125.7 lb)

Women's championship history

Women's Atomweight championship 
~ 48 kg (105.8 lb)

Tournament winners 
Road FC held its first tournament in the middleweight division in 2012. Since then, it has held tournaments in the bantamweight, featherweight, lightweight and openweight divisions, which have all led to a championship.

See also 
List of current mixed martial arts champions
List of Road FC events
List of current Road FC fighters
List of Deep champions
List of Deep Jewels Champions
List of Pancrase champions
List of Strikeforce champions
List of UFC champions
List of WEC champions
List of Pride champions
Mixed martial arts weight classes

References

External links 
 Current Title Holders roadfc.co.kr

Road FC